Hannah Tointon (born 28 December 1987) is an English actress. She is best known for playing Katy Fox in the Channel 4 soap opera Hollyoaks and Tara Brown in sitcom The Inbetweeners.

Early life
Tointon was born to parents Ken and Carol. She and her actress sister Kara (born 1983) were brought up in Leigh-on-Sea and attended St Michael's School, Leigh, and St Hilda's School in Westcliff-on-Sea.

Career
Tointon's first appearance on television was in the CBBC hit sitcom Kerching!, where she played Tamsin, the love interest of the main character Taj Lewis. Her next role was in the series Star 2003 where she played the character Billie. Following this, she played Celina Johnson in the British police drama series The Bill. She also portrayed Casey in the horror film The Children.

In 2006, she appeared in the television series Murder City, where she played Bethany Williams in the episode "Just Seventeen". She also appeared in Dream Team as Savannah Caskey. She then went on to appear in New Tricks, and had an uncredited part in the film Just My Luck as a concert goer, along with sister Kara. In early 2007, she appeared as Annabelle in Genie in the House, and also played Maxine Brogan in Doctors.

Hollyoaks
Tointon is best known for her appearance on the Channel 4 soap opera Hollyoaks. She made her first appearance on 30 April 2007, playing Katy Fox, younger sister of Warren Fox. Outside of Hollyoaks, she is close friends with Jamie Lomas (Warren Fox), Chris Fountain (Justin Burton), Roxanne McKee (Louise Summers) and Kent Riley (Zak Ramsey).

It was announced on 3 November 2007 that Tointon had quit Hollyoaks to try new things, and that she will have played the character of Katy Fox for a year. She said that her intention was always to stay just for a year.

After Hollyoaks
On 11 November 2008, she appeared in the role of an agoraphobic student named Emma Lewis in Doctors, a separate character to her previous Doctors stint. She also starred in The Children, a horror film which co-starred Jeremy Sheffield, which was released in late 2008.

In April 2010, Tointon appeared in the Cornetto Enigma TV advertisement. She appeared as Simon's girlfriend Tara, in Series 3 of the Channel 4 sitcom The Inbetweeners. Filming in spring 2010, she appeared from the second episode to the fourth. In March 2012, it was announced that Tointon would star in the forthcoming ITV2 supernatural drama Switch. In July 2012, she played a character called Frog in an episode of the E4 series The Midnight Beast, where she was Dru's girlfriend. She played Kuji in the Sinbad episode titled Kuji. Also in 2012, she played the role of Kiki Delaine in The Hour. Since 2014, Tointon has appeared as Maud Gunneson in the British-American horror series Penny Dreadful.

In September 2017 it was announced that she would be appearing in a new production of Strangers on a Train. The production was expected to tour from 5 January to 31 March 2018. In October 2019 it was announced that Tointon would take over the role of Dawn in the West End production of Waitress from 2 December 2019.

In June 2022, she appeared as Rachel Saunders in the science fiction horror TV adaptation of The Midwich Cuckoos by John Wyndham. This series was broadcast on Sky Max on 2 June 2022.

Personal life 
Tointon moved in with The Inbetweeners co-star Joe Thomas in 2012, after they met working on the show. The couple became engaged in 2017 and are currently living in London. In October 2022 they announced the birth of their first child.

Filmography

Awards and nominations

References

External links

1987 births
21st-century English actresses
English film actresses
English soap opera actresses
English television actresses
Living people
People from Southend-on-Sea